State Route 91 (SR 91) is a primary state highway in the U.S. state of Virginia.  The state highway runs  from the Tennessee state line near Damascus, where the highway continues as Tennessee State Route 91 (SR 91), north to U.S. Route 19 Business (US 19 Business) and US 460 Business at Frog Level.  SR 91 connects Damascus in southeastern Washington County with the northeastern county town Glade Spring, where the highway has junctions with US 11 and Interstate 81 (I-81).  The state highway also indirectly connects Saltville in northwestern Smyth County and Tazewell, the county seat of Tazewell County.  SR 91 is the only primary state highway in Virginia with an unpaved section; this gravel section is in southern Tazewell County.

Route description

SR 91 begins at the Tennessee state line southeast of Damascus.  The highway continues south into Tennessee as SR 91 toward Mountain City.  SR 91 heads northwest as Mountain City Road, which parallels Laurel Creek through the Iron Mountains to the creek's confluence with Whitetop Laurel Creek.  Just west of that confluence, the state highway crosses Laurel Creek, intersects the Virginia Creeper Trail rail trail, and runs concurrently with US 58 (Jeb Stuart Highway) parallel to the creek and trail into the town of Damascus.  When US 58 turns west to cross Laurel Creek into the center of town, SR 91 continues north and then west on Damascus Drive.  The state highway veers north away from Laurel Creek and leaves the town as Monroe Road, which passes through the village of Lodi between crossings of the South Fork and Middle Fork of the Holston River.

Just south of Glade Spring, SR 91 intersects US 11 (Lee Highway) and continues north as Maple Street through a diamond interchange with I-81 and into the town.  When Maple Street continues straight as SR 91 Business, SR 91 veers east as Monte Vista Drive to bypass the downtown area.  The state highway receives the northern end of the business route, Glade Street, east of downtown.  SR 91 crosses over Norfolk Southern Railway's Pulaski District and exits the town on Crescent Road, which passes through McCall Gap in Walker Mountain.  Shortly after entering the town of Saltville, where the highway is named Main Street, the highway veers east and crosses the Washington–Smyth county line.  At the east end of the downtown area, SR 91 meets the northern end of SR 107 (Worthy Boulevard).  The state highway crosses the North Fork Holston River and parallels it east as Saltville Highway to the hamlet of Broadford, where the highway meets the southern end of SR 42 (Blue Grass Trail) and turns north to follow Laurel Creek through Brushy Mountain.

SR 91 continues northeast as Veterans Road into Tazewell County. The state highway briefly follows Laurel Creek through the Freestone Valley before ascending Flattop Mountain near Tannersville. At the end of its descent from the mountain, SR 91 meets the western end of SR 607 (Little Tumbling Creek Road) and crosses the eponymous creek. Just north of the bridge, the state highway's surface changes from asphalt to gravel. SR 91 returns to asphalt road just south of its intersection with SR 604 (Thompson Valley Road), from which the highway follows Maiden Spring Road. At the hamlet of Maiden Spring, the state highway crosses the Little River, a tributary of the Clinch River, and veers east to the hamlet of Liberty. SR 91 continues east as Witten Valley Road through the namesake valley to its northern terminus at US 19 Business and US 460 Business (Crab Orchard Road) at Frog Level.

Major intersections

Glade Spring business route

State Route 91 Business (SR 91 Business) is a business route of SR 91 within the town of Glade Spring.  The highway runs  between intersections with SR 91 on the south and east sides of the town.  SR 91 Business heads north on Maple Street where SR 91 curves east to bypass the center of town on Monte Vista Drive.  One block south of the railroad tracks, the business route turns east onto Glade Street, which the highway follows through Glade Spring's downtown area.  At the east edge of downtown, SR 91 Business veers southeast to reach its northern terminus at SR 91.

References

External links

 Virginia Highways Project: VA 91

091
State Route 091
State Route 091
State Route 091